() is a Soviet-era Estonian animated movie created by Tallinnfilm in 1980. The film was directed by Rein Raamat, and the main artist was Jüri Arrak.

When it was first made, it was highly praised by other Soviet animation directors, while censors critiqued the movie for containing Estonian national elements and excessive violence. It had a short run within the country, but continued to be sent to international film festivals afterwards.

Story 
The film tells the story of an Estonian mythical god, Suur Tõll (Toell the Great), a giant said to have lived on the Baltic island of Saaremaa.

Trivia 
Clips from the film were used in folk metal band Metsatöll's music video for their song "Vaid Vaprust," from the album Äio.

References

External links 
 Suur Tõll on IMDB
 Suur Tõll on Youtube

1980 animated films
1980 films
Estonian animated films
Soviet animated films
Films based on Finno-Ugric mythology
Soviet-era Estonian films